Rory Dodd (born Port Dover, Ontario, Canada) is a Canadian rock vocalist who has performed many songs written by Jim Steinman. He is probably best known for singing as the duet voice (the "Turn around, bright eyes" lyrics) on Bonnie Tyler's version of "Total Eclipse of the Heart", a number 1 hit on the Billboard Hot 100.

Dodd performed the backing vocals for many of Meat Loaf's songs. He also sang three songs on Steinman's solo album Bad for Good (although he is only credited for two of them on the sleeve notes of the LP pressing). "Rock and Roll Dreams Come Through", was his  biggest hit as a lead singer, reaching Number 32 on the Billboard Hot 100. Singer of Fire Inc., a Wagnerian rock band that released two songs for the rock and roll film Streets of Fire (1984).

More recently, Dodd has done voiceover work for commercials. He provided the main voice in the Hungry Hungry Hippos commercial. Additionally, he provided the singing voices for “Tex and Rex” on the PBS children's show Shining Time Station from 1989 to 1993.

He is the younger brother of voice actor and singer Cal Dodd.

Dodd was inducted to the Forest City London Music Awards (FCLMA) hall of fame in 2022.

Partial discography
All with asterisks indicate Jim Steinman's involvement.

1970s
 Rockabye Hamlet (Studio cast album, 1976)
 Meat Loaf – Bat Out of Hell – (1977)*
 Ted Nugent – Cat Scratch Fever – (1977)
 Ellen Foley – Night Out – (1979)
 Garland Jeffreys – American Boy & Girl – (1979)
 Ian Hunter– You're Never Alone with a Schizophrenic – (1979)

1980s
 Jim Steinman – Bad for Good – (1981)*
 Meat Loaf – Dead Ringer – (1981)*
 Karla DeVito – Is This a Cool World or What? – (1981)*
 Peter Criss – Let Me Rock You – (1982)
 Steve Forbert – Steve Forbert – (1982)
 Billy Joel – An Innocent Man – (1983)
 Ian Hunter – All of the Good Ones Are Taken – (1983)
 Air Supply – "Making Love Out of Nothing at All" – (1983)*
 Bonnie Tyler – Faster Than the Speed of Night – (1983)*
 Original soundtrack – Streets of Fire – (1984)*
 Al Corley – Square Rooms – (1984)
 Julian Lennon – Valotte – (1984)
 Lou Reed – New Sensations – (1984)
 Billy Squier – Signs of Life – (1984)*
 Barbra Streisand – Emotion – (1984)*
 Barry Manilow – "Read 'Em and Weep" – (1984)*
 Carly Simon – Spoiled Girl – (1985)
 James Taylor – That's Why I'm Here – (1985)
 Martin Briley – Dangerous Moments – (1985)
 Rory Dodd – "A Kiss is a Terrible Thing to Waste" (demo) – (1985)*
 Rory Dodd – "Night After Night" – (1985)
 Bonnie Tyler – Secret Dreams and Forbidden Fire – (1986)*
 Julian Lennon – The Secret Value of Daydreaming – (1986)
 Patty Smyth – Never Enough – (1987)
 Rory Dodd – "Got Me Singing" – (1987)
The Monroes – Everything's Forgiven – (1987)
 Survivor – Too Hot to Sleep – (1988)
 Scritti Politti – Provision – (1988)
 Lisa Lougheed – Evergreen Nights – (1988)
 Pandora's Box – Original Sin – (1989)*

1990s 
 Garland Jeffreys – Matador & More... – (1992)
 Laura Branigan – Over My Heart – (1993)
 Meat Loaf – Bat Out of Hell II: Back into Hell – (1993)*
 Barry Manilow – Another Life – (1995)
 Meat Loaf – Welcome to the Neighborhood – (1995)*
 David Arkenstone – Quest of the Dream Warrior – (1995)
 Bon Jovi – These Days – (1995)
 Celine Dion – Falling into You – (1996)*

2000s 
 Ian Hunter – Once Bitten Twice Shy – (2000)

References

External links

Rory Dodd at Discogs.com
Rory Dodd at allmusic.com

Year of birth missing (living people)
Living people
Canadian rock singers
Neverland Express members
People from Norfolk County, Ontario